John Robin Roy (23 March 1914 – 1980) was an English professional footballer who played in the Football League for Ipswich Town,  Mansfield Town, Norwich City, Notts County, Sheffield Wednesday and Tranmere Rovers.

References

1914 births
1980 deaths
English footballers
Association football forwards
English Football League players
Norwich City F.C. players
Mansfield Town F.C. players
Sheffield Wednesday F.C. players
Notts County F.C. players
Tranmere Rovers F.C. players
Ipswich Town F.C. players